Dollarville is an unincorporated community in Luce County in the U.S. state of Michigan. The community is located within McMillan Township just west of the village of Newberry along County Road 405. As an unincorporated community, Dollarville has no legally defined boundaries or population statistics of its own.

The settlement developed around the mill and general store of the American Lumber Company in 1882. It was named for Robert Dollar, the general manager, who later made a fortune in the shipping industry. Dollarville was a station on the Detroit, Mackinac and Marquette Railroad.

A post office opened August 17, 1883 and closed October 14, 1903. The office reopened from June 3, 1904 until April 30, 1919.

Dollarville sits at 722 feet above sea level.

References

Unincorporated communities in Luce County, Michigan
Unincorporated communities in Michigan
Populated places established in 1882
1882 establishments in Michigan